KOCL-LP is an American low-power FM radio station licensed by the Federal Communications Commission (FCC) to serve the community of Anaheim, California on the frequency of 101.5 MHz. The station license is assigned to The Church In Anaheim, California. KOCL-LP airs a Christian radio format.

The FCC first licensed this station to begin operations on December 14, 2017, using callsign KOCL-LP; the station's call sign had been assigned to it on June 29, 2016.

References

External links
 Official KOCL-LP Website 
 

OCL-LP
OCL-LP
Radio stations established in 2017
2017 establishments in California